Neocollyris nilgirica is a species of ground beetle in the genus Neocollyris in the family Carabidae. It was described by Fowler in 1912.

References

Nilgirica, Neocollyris
Beetles described in 1912